Clark Tinsley Middleton (April 13, 1957 – October 4, 2020) was an American actor. He is best known for his supporting roles in Kill Bill: Vol. 2, Sin City, Fringe, Snowpiercer, and The Blacklist.

Career
Middleton's first step toward acting was signing up for a $15 acting class with friends at a California junior college. After participating in a little bit of theater in L.A., he moved to New York City to study acting. He took classes at the Herbert Berghof Studio, and Geraldine Page became his teacher.

He made his film debut in the 1983 TV movie, Miss Lonelyhearts. In 1997, Middleton wrote the one-person play, Miracle Mile, about his lifelong struggle with juvenile rheumatoid arthritis. He performed it in New York City and other parts of the US.

In the 1990s, Middleton had a recurring role on Law & Order as forensics technician, Ellis. He also played a recurring character known as Edward Markham, a rare book dealer, in the science-fiction series, Fringe. Middleton appeared as a recurring cast member on The Blacklist in which he played Glen Carter, a DMV worker who moonlights as a tracker. This is arguably his most well-known role. In 2017, he was cast as Charlie, Audrey Horne's husband, in the Showtime Network series, Twin Peaks: The Return, the sequel to the 1990s TV series, Twin Peaks.

His final performance, via Zoom, was in July 2020.  He played a weary Times Square hotel night clerk in Eugene O'Neill's one-act play, Hughie. He performed it from his bedroom.

Following Middleton's death, his character Glen also died of West Nile virus in The Blacklist season 8 episode, "The Wellstone Agency." The episode was dedicated to Middleton, and featured Huey Lewis playing himself as part of the character's memorial.

Personal life
Born Clark Tinsley Middleton on April 13, 1957, in Bristol, Tennessee, he grew up in Tucson, Arizona.

Middleton learned that he had juvenile rheumatoid arthritis when he was four and a half years old. The doctors said he would probably not live through another winter in the cold, damp climate. He summarized its effects in an interview: "At first it distorted my hands. Then the cortisone I had to take made my cheeks fat. At 8, I lost movement in my neck. When I was 15, my hip snapped. After an operation, I had to be on crutches and later, after I broke my leg falling over my dog, on canes."

He married Elissa Meyers in 2006.

Middleton died of complications from West Nile virus on October 4, 2020 at Cedars-Sinai Medical Center. He was 63 years old. He is survived by his wife Elissa.

Selected filmography

 American Playhouse (1983, TV Series) as Congregation
 Bail Jumper (1990) as Dickey
 The Contenders (1993) as John
 Law & Order (1997–2000, TV Series) as Ellis
 The Opponent (2000) as Max Weller
 Little Pieces (2000) as Bellhop
 Serendipity (2001) as Airport Cab Driver
 Kill Bill: Vol. 2 (2004) as Ernie
 $5.15/Hr. (2004, TV Movie)
 Jonny Zero (2005, TV Series) as Wally
 Sin City (2005) as Schutz
 CSI: Crime Scene Investigation (2005–2006, TV Series) as Delivery Man's Attorney / Freddie Sloan
 Live Free or Die (2006) as Larry
 The Convention (2006, Short) as Singing Hobo
 The Warrior Class (2007) as Carl Raffon
 Day Zero (2007) as Porn Clerk
 Law & Order: Special Victims Unit (2007, TV Series) as Landlord
 Noise (2007) as Board of Elections Worker #1
 The Attic (2007) as Dr. Cofi
 Last Call (2008) as Tim
 Taking Woodstock (2009) as Frank
 The Good Heart (2009) as Dimitri
 Fringe (2009–2012, TV Series) as Edward Markham
 As Good as Dead (2010) as Seth
 Hide Your Smiling Faces (2013) as Religious Man
 Aftermath (2013) as Man in Wheel Chair
 Snowpiercer (2013) as Painter
 Birdman (2014) as Sydney
 The Blacklist (2014–2020, TV Series) as Glen Carter
 Gotham (2014, TV Series) as Jimmy
 South of Hell (2015, TV Series) as Corky
 Trivia Night (2016)
 The Path (2016–2017, TV Series) as Richard
 Twin Peaks (2017, TV Series) as Charlie
 American Gods (2019, TV Series) as Sindri
 Agents of S.H.I.E.L.D. (2019, TV Series) as Pretorious Pryce
 American Sausage Standoff (2019) as Luke Kenneth Hosewall

References

External links

1957 births
2020 deaths
20th-century American male actors
21st-century American male actors
American male film actors
American male television actors
Infectious disease deaths in California
People from Bristol, Tennessee
Male actors from California
Male actors from Tennessee